Blasius's horseshoe bat (Rhinolophus blasii) is a species of insectivorous bat in the family Rhinolophidae found throughout large parts of the Mediterranean, Middle East and Africa.

Taxonomy
Blasius's horseshoe bat was described as a new species in 1866 by German naturalist Wilhelm Peters. The holotype had been collected in Italy. The eponym for the species name "blasii" was German zoologist Johann Heinrich Blasius.

Description

Biology and ecology
Blasius's horseshoe bat is insectivorous, consuming moths, termites, beetles, and flies, among other kinds. It hunts for its prey by hawking, or catching insects on the wing, or gleaning, which means plucking insects off foliage or the ground. Its social behaviors are poorly understood, but it will roost singly or in small groups. Group foraging consisting of up to five individuals has been reported in Malawi. They have one annual breeding season, and females give birth to a single young.

Range and habitat
It has a large geographic range, though its populations are patchily distributed. Its range includes Africa, Asia, and Europe. It is extinct in Italy, and possibly extinct in Slovenia. Its habitat includes deserts, savannas, shrublands, and forests.

References

Rhinolophidae
Mammals of Azerbaijan
Mammals of Afghanistan
Mammals of Pakistan
Mammals described in 1866
Taxonomy articles created by Polbot
Bats of Europe
Bats of Asia
Bats of Africa
Taxa named by Wilhelm Peters